Playa Fly (born Ibn Young on September 2, 1977) is an American rapper from Memphis, Tennessee. Fly was a member of the Three 6 Mafia (then known as Lil' Fly), but he stopped collaborating in 1995 due to monetary disputes and philosophical differences after recording one album under the group's guidance. Pursuing a solo career as Playa Fly, he released one independent album before signing a three-album contract with Super Sigg Records. During that period he had many underground hits, perhaps the most famous being "Nobody Needs Nobody". Fly's early hit immediately gained notoriety from the song "Triple Bitch Mafia", which lashed out against his former group.

Biography

Early life and Triple 6 Mafia
Young was born in Memphis in 1977 and grew up on South Parkway where he was largely raised by his grandmother. His father was the musician Willie David Young. A.K.A, Mr. Bill Chill, a former member of The Avantis and The Ovations, while his mother was a drug dealer, an activity that Young also got involved in at the age of thirteen.

Under the title Lil' Fly, Young began his career at the age of sixteen, testing the waters with "Don't Never Test His Pimpin" as a start. He eventually became affiliated with DJ Paul and Juicy J of Triple 6 Mafia (Now known as Three 6 Mafia) and under the wing of the up-and-coming producers, "Slangin' Rocks" was produced (part one featured on his underground single, part two featured on DJ Paul's Vol. 16 For Da Summa Of '94). He was featured on Gangsta Blac's underground hit album, Breakin Da Law, and the Three 6 Mafia's first mainstream album, Mystic Stylez. It was even planned for releasing Fly's first album on their label (which was, at that time, Prophet Entertainment) and his first single, "From Da Darkness Of Da Kut", was released in 1994. After leaving the group a year later, Fly put out his infamous diss record, "Triple Bitch Mafia", then changed his title to Playa Fly and was featured on Tommy Wright III's On the Run album before signing with Super Sigg Records. Playa Fly has expanded all over the south by influencing young cliques like I.B.N. (who uses Fly's real name as their title), based in Decatur, Georgia.

Super Sigg
In 1996, Playa Fly released his first album with Super Sigg, Fly Shit. The album had songs such as "Nappy Hair & Gold Teeth", "Da Show", "Crownin' Me", "Flizy Comin' (Triple Bitch Mafia pt.2)" and "Work To Do". It included other artists such as Gangsta Blac, Bill Chill, Criminal Manne, Icy K, D-A-V, Tay-Dog and Playa Posse. This album was also where Fly began his association with producer Blackout.

In 1998, Movin' On was released. Movin' On had such tracks as "Situation", "Start Runnin", "Nobody", "Funk-N-Buck" and "Write Sum Bump". It also featured Gangsta Blac, Bill Chill (Fly's father), Minnie Mae Mafia, and Cool B. Fly's father died shortly before this album's completion.

Just Gettin' It On, a re-release of his underground solo CD (with a bonus track), was released by Diamond in March 1999. Da Game Owe Me was released in November of the same year, the last album to be released by Super Sigg Records. Just Gettin' It On had songs like "Gettin' It On", "Just Awaken Shaken", "Triple Bitch Mafia" and "Fuck A Wanna Be". Just Gettin' It On included the Minnie Mae Mafia, Terror, Lil' Yo, Gangsta Blac and the late Bill Chill. The album's bonus track, "Fuck A Wanna Be", had a video made for it (under the title "Just A Wanna Be") and is Playa Fly's only music video. Da Game Owe Me featured Gangsta Blac, Thaistik, Blackout and Terror.

Minnie Mae Muzik
After leaving Super Sigg, Playa Fly created his own label named after his grandmother, Minnie Mae Muzik. On this label, Fly began production on Fly2K along with the forces of Diamond Records. Midway through the project, Fly was arrested for possession of narcotics and sent to prison to serve a seven-year sentence in 1999. The release date for Fly2K was pushed back from 2000 to 2002. Playa Fly was still present on his album while he was in prison, as he rapped a cappella over the phone ("Flexxin' Skit" and "Sap Sucka"). Fly2K was released in November 2002, the album included such songs like "Bill Chill Lives" (a tribute to Bill Chill), "Universal Heartthrob", "Here Fly Come", "Club Friendly", "We Ain't Playin Witcha", "Life Goes On" and "Few & Da Proud". The album included other artist like Mista Tito, Maimi Miane, D-A-V, Bubba Wiley, Thaistik, DeRico, R-E-G and LaCynthia.

In mid-2006, Fly was released from prison and resumed his career, with a new album planned - Mafia All Day. On July 5, a single "Horses", was featured on the XXL website. In addition to his release, Fly joined the New Prophet Camp.

In December 2010, Playa Fly released the single "Blast Off", taken from the new Mafia All Day album that has been delayed for more than two years.

Discography

Albums
 1993: From Da Darkness Of Da Kut (as Lil Fly) (underground album)
 1996: Fly Shit
 1998: Movin' On - US R&B Albums #90
 1999: Just Gettin' It On
 1999: Da Game Owe Me - US R&B Albums #63
 2002: Fly2K - US R&B Albums #64, Top Independent Albums #33
 TBA: Mafia All Day

Mixtapes
 2007: Prepare Or Beware: Da Mafia Massacre
 2010: K.O.A.K. (King of All Kings) Produced by DJ Scream
 2011: Fly In July

Guest appearances

References

External links
 
 Playa Fly MemphisRap.com Profile
 Playa Fly interview at Down-South.com
 Playa Fly interview at MemphisRap.com
 Playa Fly Biography

1977 births
African-American crunk musicians
African-American male rappers
Gangsta rappers
Living people
Prophet Entertainment
Rappers from Memphis, Tennessee
Southern hip hop musicians
21st-century American rappers